Lion Mountain (Montagne du Lion) is a mountain near Vieux Grand Port, Mauritius. It is so called because it resembles a sleeping lion.

References

External links
 Peakery

Mountains of Mauritius